Christopher John Cocksworth (born 12 January 1959) is a Church of England bishop in the open evangelical tradition. He is the current Bishop of Coventry; prior to becoming bishop he was the Principal of Ridley Hall, Cambridge.

Early life and education
He was brought up in Horsham and attended Forest School for Boys and Collyer's Sixth form College, then the University of Manchester where he earned a Bachelor of Arts degree in theology with first class honours. In 1989 he was awarded a Doctor of Philosophy (PhD) degree under the supervision of Richard Bauckham. He studied for ordination at St John's College, Nottingham.

Ordained ministry
Cocksworth was ordained a deacon at Petertide 1988 (3 July) by Michael Adie, Bishop of Guildford, and ordained a priest the following Petertide (2 July 1989) by David Wilcox, Bishop of Dorking — both times at Guildford Cathedral. He served his curacy at Christ Church, Epsom Common in the Diocese of Guildford. In 1992, he moved to become chaplain of Royal Holloway, University of London until 1997. He then became director of the Southern Theological Education and Training Scheme; a position he relinquished in 2001. He had been made an honorary canon of Guildford Cathedral in 1999. He was later the principal of Ridley Hall, Cambridge.

He was a member of the Church of England Liturgical Commission from 1999 to 2006, and was involved in revising the ordination services and the Common Worship daily prayer compilation. He is the current chair of the Faith and Order Commission of the General Synod.

Episcopal ministry
His nomination for the appointment as Bishop of Coventry on the retirement of Colin Bennetts was announced on 3 March 2008. He was formally elected by the cathedral chapter in May 2008, following the issue of a congé d'elire by Elizabeth II on 6 May 2008. He was consecrated as a bishop on 3 July 2008 in Southwark Cathedral by Rowan Williams, Archbishop of Canterbury; and was enthroned on 1 November 2008. He was the youngest serving diocesan bishop at the time of his appointment, and retained that distinction until late 2014. He entered the House of Lords, as a Lord Spiritual, on 9 November 2012.

He became the Church of England's lead bishop for Higher and Further Education in 2021.

Views
Cocksworth is against the extending of marriage to same-sex couples, and supports the Church of England current definition of Holy Matrimony (i.e. the life long union of one man and one woman).

In 2023, following the news that the House of Bishop's of the Church of England was to introduce proposals for blessing same-sex relationships, he signed an open letter which stated:

Personal life
He is married to Charlotte, daughter of David Pytches (former diocesan Bishop of Chile, Bolivia & Peru), and they have five sons.

Honours
On 15 July 2009, Cocksworth was awarded the degree of Doctor of Divinity, Honoris Causa, of the University of London. The award was conferred by Royal Holloway, University of London, at a ceremony held in the college's chapel. The University of London awards honorary degrees to those of conspicuous merit, outstanding in their field, or those who have given exceptional service to the university. Cocksworth was honoured for his services to education – particularly higher education – and to the church as well as for his service to Royal Holloway. In addition, in 2021 he received the Grand Cross of Merit of the Federal Republic of Germany.

Publications
Cocksworth has written widely on theological matters, with some of his books including:
Renewing Daily Prayer: An Introduction to Celebrating Common Prayer (1992)
Evangelical Eucharistic Thought in the Church of England (1993)
An Anglican Companion, with Alan Wilkinson (1996)
Holy, Holy, Holy, Worshipping the Trinitarian God (1997)
Prayer and the Departed (1997)
Common Worship: An Introduction (2001)
Wisdom: The Spirit's Gift (2003)
Being a Priest Today: Exploring Priestly Identity, with Rosalind Brown (2002, 2nd ed. 2006)
Holding Together: Gospel, Church and Spirit (2008), which was nominated for the 2011 Michael Ramsey Book Prize.

Styles
The Reverend Christopher Cocksworth (1988–1989)
The Reverend Doctor Christopher Cocksworth (1989–1999)
The Reverend Canon Doctor Christopher Cocksworth (1999–2008)
The Right Reverend Doctor Christopher Cocksworth (2008–present)

References

1959 births
Living people
Alumni of the University of Manchester
Bishops of Coventry
Evangelical Anglican bishops
Lords Spiritual
Spokesperson bishops in the Church of England
Alumni of St John's College, Nottingham
Staff of Ridley Hall, Cambridge
People from Horsham
People educated at The College of Richard Collyer
21st-century Church of England bishops
Academics of Royal Holloway, University of London
People associated with Royal Holloway, University of London